Elly Mathayo Okatch, better known as Okatch Biggy (1954–1997) was a Kenyan benga musician. His first album "Helena Wang’e Dongo, released in 1992 brought him into the limelight.

Early life
Okatch (Okatch Biggy) is one of the Kenyan musicians, was born in 1954 in Ujimbe, Dudi location, Gem, Siaya County Nyanza Kenya. At age 21, Okatch tried to get into boxing as a career at the Railways Club in Kisumu. He was named "Biggy" as he was larger in appearance.

Super Heka Heka

Original members of the band included : Okello Adwera (bass guitar), Paul Olang'o (vocalist), Ochieng Viva (vocalist & composer), Dick Ouma 'Wuod Gi Mbala Jasuba'(Rhythm Guitar & vocals),Owiti Ahuja (Solo guitar), Bingwa (drummer) and Okatch (founder of the band). They were later joined by Oginga Wuod Awasi.

While in Kisumu, few rich friends and lovers of his music like ; Prof. Francis Owino Rew, Hosea Songa and Oduor Leo organized a fundraising and the resultant cash was used to buy Biggy new musical instruments to start up his band.

His personal approach and singing style drew fans. Kisumu Junction Inn was the center for this music. The band's popularity later spread across Kenya.

For the two years his music career peaked, Benga maestro Okatch Biggy bestrode the entertainment industry like a colossus.

Between 1995 and 1997, the artiste gave benga music a new meaning, and went ahead to snatch its control from legend Owino Misiani whose fame spanned Kenya and Tanzania.

Biggy stole the limelight after a prolonged lull in benga, which saw kingpins like Ochieng Nelly, Collela Mazee, Awino Lawi, Ochieng Kabasellah, George Ramogi and Ouma Omore take a beating from invasion of the local scene by Congolese music.

His seismic beats and striking compositions laced with words that bordered on the lewd earned him a special place in the hearts of fans in Kisumu, Mombasa and Nairobi where he staged most of his shows.

At the time of his death on 18 December 1997, Biggy and his Super Heka Heka Band had recorded five albums and mentored young upcoming artists like Aluoch Jamaranda, Dolla Kabari, Oginga wuod Awasi, Jerry Jalamo, Ogonji Jaimbo and Otieno Small among others.

Discography

Studio albums
 Hellena
 Dorina
 Nyathi Nyakach
 Okello Jabondo

Posthumous albums
 Adhiambo Nyakobura

References

Kenyan musicians
1954 births
1997 deaths